Brian Steenson was a former Grand Prix motorcycle road racer. His best season was in 1968 when he finished the year in ninth place in the 350cc world championship. In 1969, Steenson finished second to Giacomo Agostini in the Isle of Man Junior TT. He was killed while competing in the 1970 Isle of Man TT.

References

Year of birth missing
1970 deaths
People from County Down
Motorcycle racers from Northern Ireland
250cc World Championship riders
350cc World Championship riders
500cc World Championship riders
Isle of Man TT riders
Motorcycle racers who died while racing
Sport deaths in the Isle of Man
Place of birth missing